Nijat Mammadov (born 24 January 2001) is an Azerbaijani footballer who plays as a midfielder for Kapaz in the Azerbaijan Premier League.

Club career
On 1 September 2022, Mammadov made his debut in the Azerbaijan Premier League for Kapaz match against Qarabağ.

References

External links
 

2001 births
Living people
Association football midfielders
Azerbaijani footballers
Azerbaijan youth international footballers
Azerbaijan Premier League players
Kapaz PFK players